Friedrich Karl was a cargo ship which was built by Neptun Werft, Rostock in 1938. She was requisitioned by the Kriegsmarine during the Second World War, serving as the vorpostenboot V 108 Friedrich Karl and the sperrbrecher Sperrbrecher 138. She struck a mine and sank off Borkum on 23 December 1942.

Description
The engine was built by Neptun Werft, Rostock. It was rated at 167nhp and drove a single screw propeller.

History
Friedrich Karl was built in 1938 by Neptun Werft, Rostock for Reederei Wendenhof GmbH, Wismar. The Code Letters DMXL were allocated. During the Second World War, she was requisitioned by the Kriegsmarine to serve as a Vorpostenboot. She was allocated to 1 Vorpostenbootflotille under the designation V108 Friedrich Karl. She was redesignated as a Sperrbrecher on 26 September 1941, becoming Sperrbrecher 138 with 1 Sperrbrecherflotille. On 23 December 1942, she struck a mine and sank off Borkum.

References

1938 ships
Ships built in Rostock
Steamships of Germany
Merchant ships of Germany
World War II merchant ships of Germany
Auxiliary ships of the Kriegsmarine
Maritime incidents in December 1942
World War II shipwrecks in the North Sea